Garrovillas de Alconétar is a municipality located in the province of Cáceres, Extremadura, Spain. According to the 2005 census (INE), the municipality has a population of 2372 inhabitants.

Nearby are found the remains of the Roman Alconétar Bridge.

References 

Municipalities in the Province of Cáceres